The Battle of Cătlăbuga was fought on November 16, 1485, between Stephen III of Moldavia and Ottoman forces defending the surroundings of Chilia. The Moldavian army came out victorious, but Stephen was not able to continue his actions in order to regain Chilia.

References

Notes

Bibliography
  Constantin C. Giurescu, Istoria Românilor, vol. II, Bucharest, 1938

1485 in Europe
Catlabuga
Catlabuga
Catlabuga
Battles of the Middle Ages
Military history of Ukraine
History of Odesa Oblast
Conflicts in 1485
1485 in the Ottoman Empire
15th century in Ukraine